Choi Sung-yong (born 25 December 1975) is a former South Korean football wing-back and midfielder. Known for his good stamina and concentration, Choi was noted for his ability for man-to-man defense. He performed a role to concentrate on marking Hidetoshi Nakata, considered the best Asian player at the time, when South Korea played against Japan in the late 1990s and early 2000s.

He played for South Korean national team as a right-back in the 1998 FIFA World Cup. He was also selected for the national team for the 2002 FIFA World Cup, but didn't appear on the field at that time. After the 2002 World Cup, he joined Suwon Samsung Bluewings and helped his club to win the K League title.

Career statistics

Club

International 

Scores and results list South Korea's goal tally first, score column indicates score after each Choi goal.

Honours
Suwon Samsung Bluewings
K League: 2004
Korean FA Cup: 2002
Korean League Cup: 2005
Korean Super Cup: 2005
Asian Club Championship: 2001–02
Asian Super Cup: 2002
A3 Champions Cup: 2005

Yokohama FC
J2 League: 2006

Ulsan Hyundai Horang-i
Korean League Cup: 2007

South Korea
FIFA World Cup fourth place: 2002
AFC Asian Cup third place: 2000

References

External links

Choi Sung-yong at KFA 

1975 births
Living people
Sportspeople from South Gyeongsang Province
South Korean footballers
Association football midfielders
Korea University alumni
Gimcheon Sangmu FC players
Vissel Kobe players
LASK players
Suwon Samsung Bluewings players
Yokohama FC players
Ulsan Hyundai FC players
Thespakusatsu Gunma players
J1 League players
Austrian Football Bundesliga players
2. Liga (Austria) players
J2 League players
K League 1 players
South Korea under-17 international footballers
South Korea under-20 international footballers
South Korea under-23 international footballers
Olympic footballers of South Korea
South Korea international footballers
Footballers at the 1996 Summer Olympics
Footballers at the 1998 Asian Games
1998 FIFA World Cup players
2000 AFC Asian Cup players
2001 FIFA Confederations Cup players
2002 CONCACAF Gold Cup players
2002 FIFA World Cup players
Asian Games competitors for South Korea
South Korean expatriate footballers
South Korean expatriate sportspeople in Japan
South Korean expatriate sportspeople in Austria
Expatriate footballers in Japan
Expatriate footballers in Austria